State Highway 323 (SH 323) is a Texas state highway running from Overton southeast to Henderson. The route was designated on October 30, 1939 from SH 26 (now US 259) 3 miles north of Henderson to Overton. On April 28, 1942, it extended south to Henderson. On May 18, 1944, the section from SH 64 to Henderson became part of Loop 153 (now Business US 79 and Business SH 64).

Route description
SH 323 begins at a junction with SH 135 in Overton.  It heads southeast from this junction to an intersection with FM 838.  The highway continues to the southeast to an intersection with SH 42.  Heading towards the southeast, the highway continues to a junction with Loop 571.  The highway continues to the southeast to an intersection with FM 2276.  SH 323 reaches its eastern terminus at SH 64 in Henderson.

Junction list

References

323
Transportation in Rusk County, Texas